Conneaut is a city in Ashtabula County, Ohio, United States, along Lake Erie at the mouth of Conneaut Creek  northeast of Cleveland. The population was 12,318 at the 2020 census. Conneaut is located at the far northeastern corner of the state, within the Ashtabula micropolitan area.

History

Conneaut is located on an old Native American trail, later used by early westbound pioneers. The word conneaut comes from the Seneca language, and has a disputed meaning.   A Mississauga village was located at or near Conneaut, c. 1747.

In 1796, surveyors for the Connecticut Land Company built a log storehouse here, but the permanent settlement dates from 1798. In 1832 Conneaut was incorporated, and was described in 1833 as having a printing office, one meeting house, two taverns, and several stores and shops. It became a city in 1898. Conneaut was originally named New Salem, and the parts surrounding it were named "Lakeville" from 1944 to 1964, though these were eventually combined into what is now known as "Conneaut".  People still refer to parts of Conneaut as Lakeville or Amboy.

On March 27, 1953 a three-train collision near Conneaut resulted in the deaths of 21 persons.

Geography
Conneaut is located at  (41.9433, -80.5695). Conneaut is situated along Lake Erie at the mouth of Conneaut Creek.

Conneaut is located in the northeasternmost corner of Ohio, bordering the state of Pennsylvania to the east and has  within its corporate city limits, making it the 15th-largest city in Ohio by total land area.

Conneaut is a mixture of urban areas and rural farmland. The city has over seven miles (11 km) of shoreline along Lake Erie, with beaches, boating facilities and a healthy summer tourist trade.

Climate

According to the Köppen climate classification, Conneaut has a continental maritime climate (Cfb) with warm to hot summers and cool to mild winters moderated by Lake Erie. Conneaut experiences seasonal lag due to the proximity of Lake Erie.

Demographics

2010 census
As of the census of 2010, there were 12,841 people, 4,740 households, and 3,034 families living in the city. The racial makeup of the city was 89.8% White, 7.5% African American, 0.2% Native American, 0.4% Asian, 0.4% from other races, and 1.8% from two or more races. Hispanic or Latino of any race were 1.8% of the population.

There were 4,740 households, of which 29.2% had children under the age of 18 living with them, 44.2% were married couples living together, 14.2% had a female householder with no husband present, 5.7% had a male householder with no wife present, and 36.0% were non-families. 30.3% of all households were made up of individuals, and 14% had someone living alone who was 65 years of age or older. The average household size was 2.37 and the average family size was 2.90.

The median age in the city was 39.6 years. 20.2% of residents were under the age of 18; 9.2% were between the ages of 18 and 24; 28.2% were from 25 to 44; 26.5% were from 45 to 64; and 15.7% were 65 years of age or older. The gender makeup of the city was 54.4% male and 45.6% female.

2000 census
As of the census of 2000, there were 12,485 people, 5,038 households, and 3,410 families living in the city. The population density was 473.4 people per square mile (182.8/km2). There were 5,710 housing units at an average density of 216.5 per square mile (83.6/km2). The racial makeup of the city was 96.33% White, 1.12% African American, 0.18% Native American, 0.47% Asian, 0.05% Pacific Islander, 0.23% from other races, and 1.61% from two or more races. Hispanic or Latino of any race were 1.06% of the population. 19.7% were of German, 16.0% Italian, 13.7% English, 12.0% Irish, 6.2% American and 6.2% Finnish ancestry according to Census 2000. There were 5,038 households, out of which 30.4% had children under the age of 18 living with them, 52.3% were married couples living together, 11.4% had a female householder with no husband present, and 32.3% were non-families. 27.9% of all households were made up of individuals, and 13.5% had someone living alone who was 65 years of age or older. The average household size was 2.45 and the average family size was 2.98.

In the city the population was spread out, with 25.2% under the age of 18, 7.7% from 18 to 24, 27.5% from 25 to 44, 22.4% from 45 to 64, and 17.2% who were 65 years of age or older. The median age was 38 years. For every 100 females, there were 94.2 males. For every 100 females age 18 and over, there were 89.4 males.

The median income for a household in the city was $31,717, and the median income for a family was $37,955. Males had a median income of $31,964 versus $21,198 for females. The per capita income for the city was $14,703. About 10.7% of families and 13.0% of the population were below the poverty line, including 20.3% of those under age 18 and 9.1% of those age 65 or over.

Economy
Major industries within the city include CSP of Ohio (formerly Venture Industries), General Aluminum (automotive parts), and CW Ohio (windows and pillars). The city's historic business district and its harbor business district are not as thriving as in the past. A few of the main businesses that anchor the downtown are Gerdes Pharmacy and Orlando Brothers grocery store. From 1944 until 2000, the Astatic Corporation was a major manufacturer of microphones. Astatic merged CAD (Conneaut Audio Devices) in 2000 which continues to produce microphones. Conneaut is also home to the Lake Erie Correctional Institution, which has a total staff of 295 employees as of February 2020. The port of Conneaut, Ohio is the loading point for train cars bearing iron ore for Pittsburgh area steel mills, including the Edgar Thomson Works.

Government
The city has been operated under a council-manager government since 1992.

Transportation
Transportation services Conneaut via Interstate 90, which bisects the city, along with an international shipping port and three railroads. U.S Route 20 also bisects Conneaut. Ohio State Route 7 has its northern terminus on Conneaut where it intersects with State Route 531.

Notable people
 Laura Boulton, eminent ethnologist, anthropologist and film-maker
 Mary L. Doe, first president of Michigan State Equal Suffrage Association
 Mildred Gillars, American radio personality (Axis Sally) during World War II, best known for her propaganda broadcasts for Nazi Germany
 Osee M. Hall, U.S. House Representative from Minnesota
 Joseph Russell Jones, appointed by Ulysses S. Grant as Minister Resident to Belgium
 Larry Kelley, football player for Yale University, second winner of Heisman Trophy in 1936
 Jean Lovell, All-American Girls Professional Baseball League player
 John P. McGoorty, Illinois judge and staterepresentative
 Mike Palagyi, MLB pitcher for Washington Senators
 John R. Pillion, Republican member of U.S. House of Representatives from New York
 George Morton Randall, United States Army general
 Mason A. Thayer, Republican member of Wisconsin State Assembly
 Doug Tompkins, co-founder of North Face and Esprit

Gallery

References

Further reading
 Ashtabula County Genealogical Society.  1985.  Ashtabula County history, then and now : a history of the people of the county.  Dallas:  Taylor Publishing.
 Biographical history of northeastern Ohio : embracing the counties of Ashtabula, Geauga and Lake.  1893.  Chicago:  Lewis Publishing.
 Borsvald, David.  2003.  Railroading in Conneaut, Ohio.  Images of Rail.  Chicago:  Arcadia Publishing.
 Clark, Rev. Rufus.  1880.  Early History of South Ridge.  Published in the Conneaut Reporter starting c. 22 January 1880; Reprint, 1985, Ashtabula County Genealogical Society.
 Large, Moina M.  1924.  History of Ashtabula County, Ohio.  2 vols.  Indianapolis, IN:  Historical Publishing Co.
 Owens, David B. 2010. Conneaut. Images of America. Charleston, SC: Arcadia Publishing.
 Williams, William W.  1878.  History of Ashtabula County, Ohio, with illustration and biographical sketches of its pioneers and most prominent men.  Philadelphia:  J.B. Lippincott. (Reprint, 1974, Ashtabula Genealogical Society; 1993, Higginson Book Company)

External links

 City of Conneaut
 
 

 
Cities in Ashtabula County, Ohio
Inland port cities and towns in Ohio
Ohio populated places on Lake Erie
1799 establishments in the Northwest Territory
Cities in Ohio